Motuoroi Island is a small island off the northeast of New Zealand's North Island. It is located close to the small settlement of Anaura, halfway between Tolaga Bay and Tokomaru Bay.

The New Zealand Ministry for Culture and Heritage gives a translation of "island of Roi" for Motuoroi.

See also

 List of islands of New Zealand
 List of islands
 Desert island

References

Uninhabited islands of New Zealand
Landforms of the Gisborne District